Surge Narrows Water Aerodrome  is located adjacent to Surge Narrows, British Columbia, Canada.

References

Seaplane bases in British Columbia
Discovery Islands
Strathcona Regional District
Registered aerodromes in British Columbia